Presidential elections were held in Peru in 1912. José Pardo y Barreda was elected with 81% of the vote, heading an alliance of the Civilista Party, the Liberal Alliance and the Constitutionalists.

Results

References

Presidential elections in Peru
Peru
1912 in Peru
Election and referendum articles with incomplete results